155 BONUS (BOfors NUtating Shell) is a 155 mm artillery cluster round, developed in cooperation between Bofors of Sweden and Nexter of France, designed for a long range, indirect fire top attack role against armoured vehicles. Development on BONUS began in early 1985 as a study project for the Swedish Defence Material Administration, with an initial expectation of development completion by 1989 and production start by 1990. By 1990, the development completion date had slipped to 1992. The BONUS base bleed carrier shell contains two submunitions, which descend over the battlefield on winglets and attack hardened targets with explosively formed penetrator warheads.

Design

155 BONUS is a 155 mm NATO artillery round that consists of a  heavy artillery projectile containing two autonomous, sensor-fused, fire-and-forget submunitions.

After the submunition is released it opens two winglets. While descending, the submunition rotates, scanning the area below with multi-frequency infrared sensors and LiDAR that compares the detected vehicles with a programmable target database. The submunitions each contain a high-penetration EFP warhead for use against even heavy armoured fighting vehicles like main battle tanks.

Operation

Competing systems
BONUS is very similar to the German SMArt 155 system; SMArt 155 descends on a parachute rather than a system of winglets, and uses a millimeter radar as altimeter instead of LIDAR.

The United States developed the similar M898 SADARM system (which also descended on a ballute to attack the top surfaces of armoured vehicles), but this was discontinued in favour of the GPS guided M982 Excalibur round.
US artillery largely deploys the M712 Copperhead laser-guided round for the anti-tank role.

Operators
  French Army - since 2000
  Swedish Army - since 2000
  Finnish Army - since 2014
  US Army - being procured
  Norwegian Army
  Ukrainian Ground Forces  - since 2022

Operational history
It has been sent to Ukraine in aid packages by France and potentially Sweden and Norway. 

Although rumours mentioned a kill on a Russian Pantsir-S1 system on July 5th 2022, it turned out that it was the SMArt 155 that hit it.

In January 2023 photos of a 155 mm BONUS submunition was found in Ukraine. This is the first confirmed proof of their use in Ukraine.

See also
Krasnopol
M712 Copperhead
M982 Excalibur
Strix mortar round
XM395 Precision Guided Mortar Munition

References

External links
 Bofors 155 BONUS - Video
 BAE systems
 Defencetalk.com showing the carrier casing

155mm artillery shells
Anti-tank rounds
Bofors
Cluster munition
Fire-and-forget weapons
Military equipment of NATO